Edith Nancy Sophie Bechmann Nielsen (later Scheffler, 12 May 1906 – 23 November 1994) was a Danish diver who competed in the 1924 Summer Olympics and in the 1928 Summer Olympics. She was born and died in Copenhagen. In 1924 she finished fourth in the 10 metre platform competition. Four years later she was eliminated in the first round of the 1928 10 metre platform event.

References

External links
 

1906 births
1994 deaths
Danish female divers
Olympic divers of Denmark
Divers at the 1924 Summer Olympics
Divers at the 1928 Summer Olympics
Divers from Copenhagen